Women were professionally active in the academic discipline of art history in the nineteenth century and participated in the important shift early in the century that began involving an "emphatically corporeal visual subject", with Vernon Lee as a notable example. It is argued that in the twentieth century women art historians (and curators), by choosing to study women artists, "dramatically" "increased their visibility". It has been written that women artists pre-1974 were historically one of two groups; women art historians and authors who self-consciously address high school audiences through the publication of textbooks. The relative "newness" of this field of study for women, paired with the possibility of interdisciplinary focus, emphasizes the importance of visibility of all global women in the art history field.

Education and employment
In the United States professional, academic employment for women art historians was, by the early 1970s, not commensurate with the number of female PhDs in art history. Between 1960 and 1969, 30.1% of PhDs were awarded to women but those numbers increased significantly during that period: between 1960 and 1965 it was 27%, but between 1966 and 1967 it had gone up to 43.5%. But in 1970-1971, women art historians in art departments in the US made up 23.1% of instructors, 21.6% of assistant professors, 17.5% of associate professors, and only 11.1% of full professors. Comparison with the numbers for the same years for women in the languages, from a study done by the Modern Language Association, showed that "women in C.A.A. [College Art Association] professions face[d] rather more severe discrimination than women in M.L.A. fields". Similar tendencies were reported for salary and employment in studio teaching ("preliminary statistics...indicate that women artists receive a disproportionately small share of full-time studio jobs") and in museums ("particularly significant was a tendency to hire women with BAs to be secretaries and men with BAs for trainee programs which rapidly advanced them to more challenging positions).

The history of women in the profession also suggests that art education itself has benefited from the increased presence of professional women art historians, since women students sometimes found it necessary to "redo" an education in which only a male point of view had been provided given. Paula Harper, "one of the first art historians to bring a feminist perspective to the study of painting and sculpture", and Moira Roth shared the same experience of a "one-sided training", of feeling left out. Discrimination against "women in college and university art departments and art museums" was, in the early 1970s, the immediate cause for the foundation of the Women's Caucus for Art (see below).

In a statistical study of US employment among art faculties published in 1977, Sandra Packard notes that "in art departments women have been decreasing in number since the 1930s", and that the number of women in art faculties at institutes of higher education "decreas[ed] from 22% in 1963 to a low of 19.5% in 1974", and cites statistics suggesting that "although women are concentrated at the lower ranks in art faculties, they have more Ph.D. degrees than their male colleagues."

Representation

The Women's Caucus for Art (WCA), a caucus for woman art historians, artists, and curators was founded at the 1972 meeting of the College Art Association (CAA), but re-established itself as an independent organization in 1974 after the CAA told them they could not use the CAA name anymore. According to Judith Brodsky, the CAA was, at the time, very much a male-dominated organization; she notes, though, in a 1977 article, that the Caucus is given space and time at the annual CAA conference and in the CAA's journal, Art Journal. A Lifetime Achievement Award was installed in 1979. The organization's objectives include "providing women with leadership opportunities and professional development" and "expanding networking and exhibition opportunities for women", and to that purpose publishes a newsletter, organizes sessions at conferences, and runs databases for "art and activism". In 2012 the WCA celebrated its 40th anniversary, and published a pamphlet for the annual awards ceremony that also includes a number of historical essays and reflections from the past presidents.
The Committee on Women in the Arts (CWA) operates under the auspices of the College Art Association and advocates for feminist scholarship. Each year the committee awards a "Distinguished Feminist Award".
In 2019, journalist Mona Chalabi completed a study on United States museum and diversity, finding that in 18 major museums the art collections are represented by 85% white and 87% male artists. Many United States museums (such as the National Portrait Gallery) have pledged in recent years to increase diversity in their art collections and in hires. As a result a new generation of women art historians, many of which are also women of color, have joined leading institutions.

Women art historians and feminist art theory
Feminist scholars have argued that the role of women art historians is connected to the study of women (as artists and as subjects) by art historians. In 1974, Lise Vogel noted that there were few feminist art historians, and that women art historians in general seemed unwilling to ask "the more radical critiques" a feminist scholar should engage in. In a 1998 essay, Corine Schleif argued that women and feminist scholars need to challenge the "Great Master" canon, and that they need to focus less on "style as evidence of authorship", seen as a traditionally masculine way of viewing the history of art, but rather on style as "one of many sites on the production of meaning". The topic of women scholars in art history is thus intricately connected with what scholars have called feminist art theory; Kerry Freedman, for example, claims that "women art historians often interpret art that is about and by women differently than their male colleagues". However, Carol Armstrong and Catherine de Zegher, in Women artists at the millennium (2006), argue that by the 1980s many "women art history scholars" had begun to think of feminism as irrelevant to the discipline.

Notable women art historians

References

 
 Women
Art history
Art, Women
Arts-related lists